Shmuel-Leib Yankelevich Levin (born 1890, date of death unknown) was the chief rabbi of Moscow for a brief period in 1943. He was known among Chabad hasidim as Shmuel Leib Paritcher, for his birthplace of Paritch, Belarus, where he was born in 1890. He is an alumnus of the original Yeshiva of Tomchei Temimim in Lyubavichi, and later served as mashgiach in various branches of the yeshiva.

Chief rabbis of Russia
Russian Hasidic rabbis
Chabad-Lubavitch rabbis
1890 births
Year of death missing
Rabbis from Moscow